Greene Township is a township in Worth County, in the U.S. state of Missouri.

Greene Township is named after American Revolutionary War General Nathanael Greene.

References

Townships in Missouri
Townships in Worth County, Missouri